is a Japanese tarento, singer, actor, and comedian.

Discography

Singles

Original albums

Live albums

Filmography

Music programmes

Variety series

TV drama

Films

Stage

Music videos

Advertisements

References

External links
  
 

Japanese comedians
Japanese male actors
Japanese male rock singers
Japanese television presenters
Male deaf actors
1947 births
Living people
People from Shibuya
Comedians from Tokyo
Japanese deaf people